Arta serialis is a species of snout moth in the genus Arta. It was described by George Hampson in 1897 and is known from Brazil.

References

Chrysauginae
Moths of South America
Pyralidae of South America
Moths described in 1897
Taxa named by George Hampson